Pukanec ( / Puk(k)an(t)z,) is a village and municipality (historical town) in the Levice District in the Nitra Region of southern Slovakia.

Etymology
The name is probably derived from a personal name Baka, Bak, Bukan/Pukan or potentially from Slovak buk (beech).

History
In the past, it was one of the nine free royal mining towns, where silver and other precious ore was mined. 
In historical records Pukanec was first mentioned in 1075 under the name villa Baka, a location in the region of today's Pukanec and Devičany. This note describes the borders of ownership of land given by the Hungarian King to the Monastery in Hronský Beňadik Hronský Beňadik. Outside these borders there was a land of miners. And in this document there is only one "villa Baka" mentioned, which means that there was only one Baka - with Slovak inhabitants. 
Afterwards in later notes from the 11th and 12th centuries AD Nemeth and Toth Baka are mentioned as two separate settlements. The Toth Baka - the Slovak one, is older. And as far as is known the first German colonist arrived in the 12th century AD, which means that the mention from the year 1075 is a mention of Toth Baka, which is today's Devičany. As far as we know, the Nemeth Baka - the German one ("Nemeth" is a Hungarian word referring to Germans), was established later by Schwabian Germans. Today's Pukanec is descended from the German Baka.
Lacking of records to put this to discussion, perhaps future systematic archaeological excavations will reveal the truth.
The name Pukanec comes from Bukan which was the exclusive name of the grand noble family of Hont-Pázmány, the first known owner of Baka . In 1270 the first written mention about silver ore is made. In 1323, King Charles I of Hungary granted town rights to Pukanec. Just 22 years later, it became a free royal mining town. In 1405. King Sigismund declared a free mining enterprise and ordered to build fortifications. From 1424 until 1548, along with other mining towns it was property of queens. In April 1564, the Turks, attacking from the south, appeared below the city gates but were repulsed until 1 October 1640 when they successfully raided and sacked the town. The Turks again raided and sacked Pukanec in 1664. She was a sanjak of Uyvar eyalet as Bukabak for 22 years in Ottoman Empire. Those events marked the beginning of Pukanec's decline, when the mines were slowly depleted. Towards the end of the 18th century, only one mine was still rich in gold. The last record about mining in Pukanec was in 1842, though some mining activity continued until 1891. In 1876, Pukanec was demoted from the royal free mining town to a municipality belonging to the Hont county.

Geography
The village lies at an altitude of 354 metres and covers an area of 26.196 km2. It has a population of 2067 people. It is located near the Štiavnica Mountains, in the Sikenica river valley. It is located around 18 km northeast of Levice.

Demographics
The village is approximately 95.7% Slovak, 0.6% Hungarian, and 1.1% Romani.

Facilities
The village has a public library a gym and football pitch. It is also stated https://en.wikipedia.org/wiki/Morus_nigra that the vineyards of Pukanec are home to an extraordinary collection of Black Mulberry trees.

References

External links
Municipal website

Villages and municipalities in Levice District